Moussa Mohamed (born 1925) was an Egyptian footballer. He competed in the men's tournament at the 1952 Summer Olympics.

References

External links
 
 

1925 births
Possibly living people
Egyptian footballers
Egypt international footballers
Olympic footballers of Egypt
Footballers at the 1952 Summer Olympics
Place of birth missing
Association football defenders